Kakka Thollayiram is a 1991 Indian Malayalam film, directed by V. R. Gopalakrishnan. The film stars Mukesh, Urvashi, Chithra and Sukumari in the lead roles. The film has musical score by Johnson. Urvashi won the Kerala State Film Award for Best Actress for her performance in the film.

Plot
Revathy, sister of Rajashekaran is mentally handicapped, due to typhoid that affected her brain during childhood. Rajashekaran loves his sister more than anything else in the world. Balakrishnan, Rajashekharan's friend is also dearly attached to Revathy.

Revathy's favourite story, which Rajashekharan has told her, is that of the princess who had collected a coral bead each day for many years awaiting her prince. After hearing the story, Revathy assumes herself as the princess waiting for the prince, and had started collecting coral beads each day.

Ravi, who is a friend of Balakrishnan rapes Revathy and she eventually becomes pregnant. Rejashekharan is enraged when he finds out. However, Revathy views Ravi as her “prince”, and has fallen in love with him. She wishes to marry her "prince". Rajashekaran reluctantly agrees and asks Balakrishnan to bring Ravi.

Ravi declines to marry Revathy because she is  mentally handicapped, which further enrages Rajashekharan. However, Ravi comes to realise his mistake and agrees to Balakrishnan to marry Revathy. When Ravi returns, Rajashekaran, not knowing that Ravi has accepted Revathy, brutally beats and stabs him. Revathy is shocked to know that the prince for whom she was waiting for, is dead.

Cast

Soundtrack
The music was composed by Johnson and the lyrics were written by Kaithapram.

Awards
Kerala State Film Award
 Best Actress- Urvashi

References

External links
 

1991 films
1990s Malayalam-language films
Films scored by Johnson